Otradov is a municipality and village in Chrudim District in the Pardubice Region of the Czech Republic. It has about 300 inhabitants.

History
The first written mention of Otradov is from 1349. Until 1995, it was an administrative part of Krouna. Since 1996, it has been a separate municipality.

References

External links

Villages in Chrudim District